Winter Chill is a 1995 novel from Australian author Jon Cleary. It was the twelfth book featuring Sydney detective Scobie Malone and centers on the death of an American lawyer at a convention – and the murder of the security guard who found him.

References

External links
Winter Chill at AustLit (subscription required)

1995 Australian novels
Novels set in Sydney
HarperCollins books
William Morrow and Company books
Novels by Jon Cleary